10th Group may refer to:

 10th Group CIS, a unit of the Belgian Army mural
 10th Special Forces Group (United States), a unit of the United States Army

See also
 Tenth Army (disambiguation)
 X Corps (disambiguation)
 10th Division (disambiguation)
 10th Brigade (disambiguation)
 10th Regiment (disambiguation)
 10 Squadron (disambiguation)